Valentina Aracil (born 28 December 1966) is an Argentine breaststroke and individual medley swimmer. She competed in four events at the 1988 Summer Olympics.

Personal life
Aracil moved for studies to Michigan, United States in 1988. She now resides in Little Rock, Arkansas, after living in Minnesota and Mississippi. She is married to fellow Argentine Olympic swimmer Luis Juncos and they have two American-born children, both association football players, a son and a daughter (Argentina women's national football team member Natalie Juncos).

References

External links
 

1966 births
Living people
Sportspeople from Mar del Plata
Argentine female breaststroke swimmers
Argentine female medley swimmers
Olympic swimmers of Argentina
Swimmers at the 1988 Summer Olympics
Pan American Games competitors for Argentina
Swimmers at the 1987 Pan American Games
20th-century Argentine women